Laura Tamminen was a Finnish speed skater. She won a bronze medal at the World Allround Speed Skating Championships for Women in 1939 in Tampere, behind Verné Lesche and Liisa Salmi.

References

External links

Year of birth missing
Possibly living people
Finnish female speed skaters
World Allround Speed Skating Championships medalists